The Forbidden Path is a 1918 American silent drama film directed by J. Gordon Edwards and starring Theda Bara. The film is now considered lost.

Plot
As described in a film magazine, while posing for Felix Benavente (Mason) for a painting for a church, Mary Lynde (Bara), a true Madonna type unaware of the wiles of men, meets Robert Sinclair (Thompson) and, believing him sincere, accepts his attentions. Her father (Law) casts her from his home, and Mary goes to live at Sinclair's mountain lodge. However, Sinclair betrays her and deserts her. The death of her child takes the last bit of ambition from her and she sinks to the lowest depths. Felix, in search of a model to represent the end of the path of sin, rescues her. The appearance of Sinclair and his fiancee Barbara Reynolds (Martin) at the studio brings a desire for revenge to Mary, and she forces Sinclair to establish her in an apartment and supply her with money. To do this, Sinclair is forced to steal, and with this evidence Mary makes Sinclair promise to marry her. Sinclair tries to kill her, but on the morning of the wedding Mary goes to the church and confesses everything. Sinclair leaves in disgrace while Felix goes to comfort Mary.

Cast
 Theda Bara as Mary Lynde
 Hugh Thompson as Robert Sinclair
 Sidney Mason as Felix Benavente
 Walter Law as Mr. Lynde 
 Florence Martin as Barbara Reynolds
 Wynne Hope Allen as Mrs. Lynde
 Alphonse Ethier as William Sinclair
 Lisle Leigh as Mrs. Byrne
 Reba Porter as Tessie Byrne

Reception
Like many American films of the time, The Forbidden Path was subject to cuts by city and state film censorship boards. For example, the Chicago Board of Censors issued the film an Adults Only permit and required cuts, in Reel 4, of all interior views of the house of ill fame showing inmates (leave in scene where three young women rush out to aid Mary and last scene in house where woman shows Mary the dead baby) to include all views of statuary in background, Reel 5, young woman soliciting man, closeup of alleged sex pervert knitting in foreground, all but one view of men of same character being ejected from resort to conform with National Board eliminations, and, Reel 6, a shooting scene.

See also
List of lost films
1937 Fox vault fire

References

External links

1918 films
1918 drama films
1918 lost films
Silent American drama films
American silent feature films
American black-and-white films
Films based on short fiction
Films directed by J. Gordon Edwards
Fox Film films
Lost American films
Lost drama films
1910s American films